The women's 78 kg judo competitions at the 2022 Commonwealth Games in Birmingham, England took place on August 3rd at the Coventry Arena. A total of eight competitors from seven nations took part.

Results
The draw is as follows:

Repechages

References

External link
 
 Results
 

W78
2022
Commonwealth W78